JS Vieux-Habitants is a Guadeloupean football club based in the town of Vieux-Habitants. They play in Guadeloupe's first division, the Guadeloupe Division of Honor.

Achievements
Guadeloupe Championnat National: 2
 2006, 2010

External links
 Tour des clubs 2008–2009 – Gwadafoot 
 Club info – French Football Federation 
 https://int.soccerway.com/teams/guadeloupe/js-vieux-habitants/13319/

Vieux-Habitants